The 2017–18 Western Carolina Catamounts men's basketball team represented Western Carolina University during the 2017–18 NCAA Division I men's basketball season. The Catamounts, led by 13th-year head coach Larry Hunter, played their home games at the Ramsey Center in Cullowhee, North Carolina as members of the Southern Conference. They finished the season 13–19, 8–10 in Southern Conference play to finish in sixth place. They lost in the quarterfinals of the Southern Conference tournament to Furman.

Following the loss to Furman, Larry Hunter resigned as head coach. He finished his coaching career at Western Carolina with a record of 193–229 over 13 seasons. Winthrop associate head coach Mark Prosser, son of the late Skip Prosser, was named Hunter's successor.

Previous season
The Catamounts finished the 2016–17 season 9–23, 4–14 in Southern Conference play to finish in a tie for eighth place. They lost in the first round of the Southern Conference tournament to The Citadel.

Offseason

Player departures

Recruiting Class of 2017

Incoming transfers

Roster

Schedule and results

|-
!colspan=9 style=|Regular season

|-
!colspan=9 style="| SoCon tournament

References

Western Carolina Catamounts men's basketball seasons
Western Carolina
West
West